Trachipterus is a genus of ribbonfishes.

Species
There are currently six recognized species in this genus:
 Trachipterus altivelis Kner, 1859 (King-of-the-salmon)
 Trachipterus arcticus (Brünnich, 1771) (Dealfish)
 Trachipterus fukuzakii Fitch, 1964 (Tapertail ribbonfish)
 Trachipterus ishikawae D. S. Jordan & Snyder, 1901 (Slender ribbonfish)
 Trachipterus jacksonensis (E. P. Ramsay, 1881) (Blackflash ribbonfish)
 Trachipterus trachypterus (J. F. Gmelin, 1789) (Mediterranean dealfish)

References

Lampriformes